The 1993 Sky Sports International Open was a professional ranking snooker tournament that took place between 2–11 April 1993 at the Plymouth Pavilions in Plymouth, England with TV coverage on Sky Sports beginning on 5 April. It was the first International Open held since 1989 and is now moved to April for this season only as the last ranking tournament before the World Championship.

Stephen Hendry won the title by defeating the defending champion Steve Davis 10–6 in the final. 


Main draw

References

Scottish Open (snooker)
International Open
International Open
International Open
Sport in Plymouth, Devon